Celia Maestre Martín (born 26 March 1981) is a Spanish track and field sighted guide and social worker who has represented Spain at the 2004, 2008 and 2012 Summer Paralympics as a guide.

Personal 
Maestre was born on 26 March 1981 in Valencia. She is from the Valencia region of Spain. She is married to David Casinos, and is a social worker.  The pair were dating in 2004.  In 2004, she was a sociology student. In 2012, she lived in Moncada, Valencia.

Athletics 
Maestre became David Casinos guide in 2002. She was guide for Casinos at the 2004 Summer Paralympics.  At the time, they were dating and broke Paralympic taboo by sharing a room together in the Paralympic village. She was a guide at the 2008 Summer Paralympics in athletics for Casinos, where they won a gold medal. She competed at the 2012 Summer Paralympics as a guide. Spain's 14 strong visually impaired athletics delegation to the London Games participated in a training camp at the Center for Sports Modernization in  La Rioja ahead of the Games.

References 

1981 births
Living people
Spanish sighted guides
Paralympic sighted guides
Paralympic athletes of Spain
Athletes (track and field) at the 2004 Summer Paralympics
Athletes (track and field) at the 2008 Summer Paralympics
Athletes (track and field) at the 2012 Summer Paralympics
Sportspeople from Valencia